Ophyx crinipes is a moth of the family Erebidae. It is found in Indonesia and Papua New Guinea.

References

Ophyx
Moths described in 1874